Stefan Kisielewski (7 March 1911 in Warsaw – 27 September 1991 in Warsaw, Poland), nicknames Kisiel, Julia Hołyńska, Teodor Klon, Tomasz Staliński, was a Polish writer, publicist, composer and politician, and one of the members of Znak, one of the founders of the Unia Polityki Realnej, the Polish libertarian and conservative political party.

Biography
Kisielewski was born to a Polish father Zygmunt Kisielewski and a Jewish mother Salomea Szapiro.

In 1927 he entered the State Conservatory of Music in Warsaw, where he received three diplomas: in theory (1934, under Kazimierz Sikorski), in composition (1937, also under K. Sikorski) and in pedagogical piano (1937, under Jerzy Lefeld). He also studied Polish literature and philosophy at Warsaw University and completed his composition studies in Paris, in the years 1938–39.

As a composer, Kisielewski remained firmly rooted in French neo-classicism, although his writings supported contemporary musical trends in Poland more broadly .

His writing and political thought were generally marked by pragmatism and support for liberalism.

In 1964 he was one of the signatories of the so-called Letter of 34 to Prime Minister Józef Cyrankiewicz regarding freedom of culture. In 1968, for criticizing censorship in communist Poland (at the meeting of the Polish Writers' Union he used the designation 'dyktatura ciemniaków' – 'a dictatorship of dunces' – which became famous in Poland), he was forbidden to publish for three years. He was also beaten up by so-called "unknown perpetrators" (a euphemism for perpetrators of criminal acts of political violence who in all likelihood were members of the Communist secret police). In 1981 he coined the sentence "It's not a crisis, it's a result" to describe the down turn of the Polish economy at that time as a result of socialism. Another one of his famous statements was "socialism heroically overcomes difficulties unknown in any other system", referring to the fact that many of the economic and social ills found under socialism were self-created.

In 1990, together with the magazine Wprost, he established the Kisiel Prize.

Works

Music essays 
 Gwiazdozbiór muzyczny (1958),
 Muzyka i mózg (1974)

Political essays 
 Polityka i sztuka (1949),
 Felietony zdjęte przez cenzurę – Warszawa 1998
 Rzeczy małe – Warszawa 1998
 Dzienniki – Warszawa 1997 (wydanie II)
 100 razy głową w ścianę (Paryż 1972), Warszawa 1997
 Wołanie na puszczy – Warszawa 1997
 Testament Kisiela – Warszawa 1992
 Abecadło Kisiela – Warszawa 1990
 Na czym polega socjalizm? Stosunki Kościół-Państwo w PRL – Poznań 1990 (wydanie II)
 Kisiel przedwojenny – Warszawa 2001.

Various essays 
 Rzeczy małe (1956)
 Opowiadania i podróże (1959)
 Z literackiego lamusa (1979)
 Materii pomieszanie (Londyn 1973)
 Moje dzwony trzydziestolecia (Chicago 1978)

Novels 
 Sprzysiężenie (1947)
 Zbrodnia w dzielnicy Północnej (1948)
 Widziane z góry i Cienie w pieczarze (1971)
 Romans zimowy (1972)
 Śledztwo (1974)
 Ludzie z akwarium (1976)
 Przygoda w Warszawie (1977)
 Wszystko inaczej – Warszawa 1991 (wydanie IV)

Musical compositions 
 Capriccio energico, for violin and piano (1956)
 Concerto, for chamber orchestra (1948)
 Concerto, for piano and orchestra (1980–91)
 Cosmos I, for orchestra (1970)
 Danse vive, for piano (1939)
 Dialogi, for 14 instruments (1970)
 Divertimento, for flute and string orchestra (1964)
 Impresja kapryśna, for flute alone (1982)
 Intermezzo, for clarinet and piano (1951)
 Kaprys wiejski [Rustic Caprice], for piano (1952)
 Kołysanka [Lullaby], for piano (1968)
 Melodia kurpiowska [Kurpian Melody], for female chorus and folk ensemble (1951)
 Perpetuum mobile, for orchestra (1955)
 Podróż w czasie [A Journey in Time], for string orchestra (1965)
 Rapsodia wiejska [Rustic Rhapsody], for chamber orchestra (1950)
 Serenade, for piano (1945, rev. 1974)
 Signały sportowe [Sports Signals], overture (1966)
 Sonata, for clarinet and, piano (1972)
 Sonata no. 1, for piano
 Sonata no. 2, for piano (1945, rev. 1955)
 Spotkania na pustyni [Meetings in a Desert], for ten players (1969)
 String Quartet (1935)
 Suite, for flute and clarinet (1961)
 Suite, for oboe and piano (1954)
 Suite, for piano (1955)
 Symfonia w kwadracie [Symphony in a Square], for orchestra (1978)
 Symphony no. 1 (1939, lost)
 Symphony no. 2 (1951)
 Symphony, for 15 players (1961)
 3 sceny burzliwe [Three Stormy Scenes], for piano (1983)

See also 
Kisiel Award

Sources 
 
  
 Soszyński, Marek. 2022. Stefan Kisielewski on Music and Aesthetics.

External links
 Kisielewski page at the Polish Music Center
 Stefan Kisielewski at PWM Edition

1911 births
1991 deaths
Musicians from Warsaw
People from Warsaw Governorate
Polish people of Jewish descent
Polish Roman Catholics
Znak (association) members
Real Politics Union politicians
Members of the Polish Sejm 1957–1961
Members of the Polish Sejm 1961–1965
Polish male writers
Polish composers
20th-century composers
Polish music critics
Polish publicists
Chopin University of Music alumni
Academic staff of the Academy of Music in Kraków
Polish resistance members of World War II
Burials at Powązki Cemetery
Polish conservatives
People associated with the magazine "Kultura"